Boris Premužič (born 26 December 1968 in Ljubljana) is a former Slovenian cyclist.

Palmares

1993
1st Overall Tour of Slovenia
1995
1st Stage 4 Tour of Slovenia
1996
3rd Overall Okolo Slovenska
1997
1st Stage 4 Okolo Slovenska
1998
2nd Overall Tour of Yugoslavia
2001
3rd National Time Trial Championships
2002
1st  National Road Race Championships
2004
2nd National Road Race Championships
3rd National Time Trial Championships

References

1968 births
Living people
Slovenian male cyclists